Tommy Sören Sjödin (born August 13, 1965) is a Swedish former professional ice hockey defenceman, who played 106 NHL games during two seasons, five years for clubs in the Swiss Nationalliga A and fifteen seasons with Brynäs IF in the Swedish Elitserien.

Playing career
Sjödin played in the Swedish Elitserien with Brynäs IF from 1986 to 1992, winning the Golden Puck as Sweden's top player in 1991-92. He went on to play in the National Hockey League for the Minnesota North Stars, Dallas Stars, and Quebec Nordiques between 1992 and 1994. He played in Switzerland with HC Lugano from 1994 to 1998, except for a brief period with HC Bolzano in Italy in 1996-97.

Before Sjödin returned to the Swedish Elite League, he played one season with Kloten. He then rejoined his former team, Brynäs IF, which was to become his last.

February 3, 2007, in an away game against Frölunda, putting Brynäs up 2-1 he became the oldest player ever to score a goal in Elitserien; at the age of 41 years, 5 months and 21 days, breaking Börje Salming's record from 1992.

Sjödin played for the Swedish national team in four IIHF World Championships from 1992 to 1996, and was on the 1992 Olympic team.

Career statistics

Regular season and playoffs

International

References

External links

1965 births
Living people
Bolzano HC players
Brynäs IF players
Dallas Stars players
HC Lugano players
Ice hockey players at the 1992 Winter Olympics
EHC Kloten players
Kalamazoo Wings (1974–2000) players
Minnesota North Stars draft picks
Minnesota North Stars players
Olympic ice hockey players of Sweden
People from Timrå Municipality
Quebec Nordiques players
Swedish expatriate sportspeople in Austria
Swedish expatriate ice hockey players in Canada
Swedish expatriate sportspeople in Switzerland
Swedish expatriate ice hockey players in the United States
Swedish ice hockey defencemen
Timrå IK players
Sportspeople from Västernorrland County